"You Remind Me of Something" is a song by American R&B singer R. Kelly. Released as the lead single from his self-titled album (1995), it became the fourth song from Kelly to reach number one on the US Billboard Hot R&B Singles chart, where it stayed for a week, and peaked at number four on the Billboard  Hot 100. Worldwide, it peaked at number 13 in New Zealand and found moderate success in the Netherlands and the United Kingdom.

The song's spoken opening line, "You remind me of something...I just can't think of what it is" would be sampled in 2002 for the original version of Kelly's hit "Ignition".

Critical reception
Gil L. Robertson IV from Cash Box picked "You Remind Me of Something" as a "standout track" of the R. Kelly album. James Masterton for Dotmusic wrote, "This is yet another typical R. Kelly single, displaying as it does all that is both good and bad about US swingbeat tracks."

Music video
The accompanying music video for "You Remind Me of Something" is directed by David Nelson.

Charts

Weekly charts

Year-end charts

Certifications

See also
 List of number-one R&B singles of 1995 (U.S.)

References

R. Kelly songs
1995 singles
1995 songs
Song recordings produced by R. Kelly
Songs written by R. Kelly